Becoming is the eleventh studio album by American singer Yolanda Adams. Her first album in four years, it was released on May 3, 2011 on N-House Music Group as a Wal-Mart exclusive. Its release was preceded by the lead single "Be Still" which reached number 4 on the Billboard Gospel Songs. A critical success, Becoming received Stellar Awards, NAACP Image Awards, and GMA Dove Awards nominations. It won Adams won her fourth Best Gospel Artist.

Track listing

Charts

Release history

References

Yolanda Adams albums
2011 albums